The 2011–12 V AFG season is the 57th season of the Bulgarian V AFG, the third tier of the Bulgarian football league system. The winners of each of the four regional groups progress to the 2012–13 B PFG, and up to four teams from each group are relegated to regional amateur championships.

Changes from the 2010–11 season

Movement between B PFG and V AFG
The champions of the four 2010–11 V AFG divisions were promoted to the 2011–12 B PFG: Spartak Varna from V AFG North-East and Botev Plovdiv from V AFG South-East promoted to the B PFG East, Bdin Vidin from V AFG North-West and Slivniski Geroy Slivnitsa from V AFG South-West ascended to the B PFG West. As the East B PFG needed one more team from the third division, the two runners-up from the Eastern divisions Neftochimic Burgas and Septemvri Tervel played a special play-off on 26 June 2011. Neftohimic won the match 1:0.

In return, Chernomorets Balchik, Dunav Ruse and Ravda canceled their participation during the East B PFG championship and relegated automatically in the third division. Ravda and Dunav Ruse even dissolved themselves, so they won't participate this season. Chernomorets Balchik will participate in the North-East V AFG. Additionally two more teams - Brestnik and Spartak Plovdiv - canceled their East B PFG participation after the end of the last season and automatically relegated into the South-East V AFG.

From West B PFG relegated three teams - Kom-Minyor canceled its participation during the season and dissolved as club, Botev Krivodol will play in the North-West V AFG and Vihren Sandanski have not received a professional licence, but due financial difficulties they canceled its participation in the South-West V AFG. Additionally the team of Pirin Blagoevgrad, which have not received a license for the 2011-12 A PFG, relegated to the third division. The team is struggling financially, so they have decided not to participate in the South-West V AFG.

Movement from V Group to fourth-level leagues
In the North-East V AFG the teams of Sportist General Toshevo, Kubrat, Topolite and Shabla resigned form the championship in different stages during the season. Additionally Skrita Sila Mudrevo decided not to participate in the new season. The new teams coming from the regional divisions are Lokomotiv Kaspichan and the newly founded Dunav 2010 Ruse (which should not be confused with the dissolved Dunav Ruse). The team of Makak 2008 Shumen renamed itself and this season they will play as Shumen 2010.

The South-East V AFG was left from Gabrovnitsa Gorno Strahane and Stambolovo. The new teams are Sportist Roza and Master Burgas. Also the team of Maritsa Plovdiv united with Rakovski, so this season the team is called Rakovski 2011 and will play its games in the town of Rakovski.

The North-West V AFG was joined by Cherven Bryag and Dunav Selanovtsi. They replace Samovodene and Botev Dimovo, which could not afford their participation this season.

The new teams in the South-West V AFG are Oborishte Panagyurishte, Belasitsa Petrich, the newly founded Marek 2010 Dupnitsa and Rilski Sportist Samokov. Benovski Pazardzhik canceled their participation for the new season. Additionally the team of Lokomotiv Septemvri united with the newly founded Hebar 2011 Pazardzhik (not to be confused with Hebar Pazardzhik) and will play under the name Hebar 2011 Pazardzhik.

Promotion to East B PFG

North-East V AFG

South-East V AFG

Promotion to West B PFG

North-West V AFG

South-West V AFG

References

2012
Bul
3